Krev interaction trapped protein 1 is a protein that in humans is encoded by the CCM1 gene.  This gene contains 16 coding exons and is located on chromosome 7q21.2.  Loss of function mutations in CCM1 result in the onset of Cerebral cavernous malformation.  Cerebral cavernous malformations (CCMs) are vascular malformations in the brain and spinal cord made of dilated capillary vessels.

Interactions 

The normal CCM1 protein, KRIT1 (Krev Interaction Trapped), is 736 amino acids in length and has a variety of functions.  KRIT1 has been shown to interact with multiple signaling pathways including; ITGB1BP1., reactive oxygen species, cell death, and angiogenesis.  Related to the CCM illness, this protein is required for maintaining the structural integrity of the vasculature.

References

Further reading